The 74th district of the Texas House of Representatives consists of a small part of El Paso County, as well as the entirety of the following counties: Brewster, Culberson, Hudspeth, Jeff Davis, Kinney, Maverick, Presidio, Reeves, Terrell, and Val Verde. The current Representative is Eddie Morales Jr., who has represented the district since 2021.

References 

74